Third Degree is a 1986 album by Johnny Winter and the final one of the trilogy he made for Alligator Records. For the occasion Winter temporarily reunited with Tommy Shannon and Uncle Red Turner, who were the rhythm section on his first three albums, for three of the tracks. Another notable guest on the record is Doctor John, who performed on "Love, Life and Money" and "Tin Pan Alley". Winter also included a couple of solo acoustic numbers, "Evil on My Mind" and "Bad Girl Blues", practicing for months with a National Steel Guitar.

Track listing 
"Mojo Boogie" (J.B. Lenoir) — 
"Love, Life and Money" (Willie Dixon, Henry Glover) — 
"Evil on My Mind" (Johnny Winter) — 
"See See Baby" (Freddie King, Sonny Thompson) — 
"Tin Pan Alley" (Jerry Jones) — 
"I'm Good" (Bill Collins, Bonnie Lee) — 
"Third Degree" (Eddie Boyd, Willie Dixon) — 
"Shake Your Moneymaker" (Elmore James) — 
"Bad Girl Blues" (William Borum a.k.a. Memphis Willie B. ) — 
"Broke and Lonely" (John Jacob Watson a.k.a. Johnny Guitar Watson) —

Personnel 
Johnny Winter — electric guitar, National steel guitar, vocals
Ken Saydak — piano
Doctor John — piano on 2 and 5
Johnny B. Gayden - bass
Tommy Shannon — bass on 4, 8 and 10
Uncle Red Turner — drums on 4, 8 and 10
Casey Jones — drums

References

1986 albums
Johnny Winter albums
Albums produced by Johnny Winter
Alligator Records albums